Monte Vista National Wildlife Refuge is a United States National Wildlife Refuge located in southern Colorado. The refuge is located in the San Luis Valley south of the town of Monte Vista, Colorado in southeastern Rio Grande County, Colorado, in the watershed of the Rio Grande. It was established in 1953 by the Migratory Bird Conservation Commission to provide a habitat for wildlife, particularly waterfowl, in the San Luis Valley.

Description and history
The site was historically an agricultural area and thus water is intensively managed on the refuge, especially in comparison to the nearby Alamosa refuge. Irrigation includes numerous dikes and other water control structures that provide water to a patchwork of diverse wetland habitats ranging from shallow wet meadows to open water. The refuge includes Artesian wells, pumped wells  and irrigation canals, some dating to the "ditch boom" of the 1880s. The refuge is a major stopover for migrating greater sandhill cranes moving  between their wintering area around Bosque del Apache National Wildlife Refuge  in New Mexico and breeding grounds in the northern United States and southern  Canada. Up to 20,000 cranes pass through in the spring and again in the fall.  Three remaining endangered whooping cranes from a failed attempt to establish  a wild migratory population in the 1980s can be seen migrating with their foster species, the sandhill crane. Beginning in the 1980s, a herd of elk began using the refuge. At present, several hundred elk may be seen on the refuge seeking winter food and sanctuary  from hunting pressure on nearby public lands.

References

National Wildlife Refuges in Colorado
Protected areas of Rio Grande County, Colorado
Protected areas established in 1953
Sangre de Cristo National Heritage Area
Wetlands of Colorado
Landforms of Alamosa County, Colorado
Landforms of Rio Grande County, Colorado